The Beaver Coat is a 1949 East German comedy film directed by Erich Engel and starring Fita Benkhoff, Werner Hinz and Käthe Haack. It is an adaptation of Gerhart Hauptmann's  1893 play The Beaver Coat, previously adapted into a 1928 silent film and a 1937 sound film produced during the Nazi era.

It was made at the Johannisthal Studios in Berlin and on the backlot of Babelsberg Studios, both of which fell into the Eastern Zone of occupation in 1945 and were under the control of the state-owned DEFA organisation. Location shooting also took place in Potsdam. The film's sets were designed by the art director Otto Erdmann.

Cast

See also
The Beaver Coat (1928 film)
The Beaver Coat (1937 film)

References

External links

East German films
German historical comedy films
1940s historical comedy films
Remakes of German films
Films directed by Erich Engel
German films based on plays
Films based on works by Gerhart Hauptmann
German black-and-white films
Films set in Berlin
Films set in the 1880s
Films shot at Babelsberg Studios
Films shot at Johannisthal Studios
1940s German-language films
1940s German films